PBHS may refer to:

 South Africa
 Pretoria Boys High School, founded in 1901 in Pretoria, Gauteng
 Pinetown Boys' High School, founded in 1955 in Pinetown, KwaZulu-Natal
 United States
 Pompano Beach High School, founded in 1928 Pompano Beach, Florida
 Palm Bay Magnet High School, founded in the 1950s in Melbourne, Florida
 Philip Barbour High School, founded in 1963 in Barbour County, West Virginia
 Pine Bluff High School, in Pine Bluff, Arkansas
 Paint Branch High School, founded in 1969 Burtonsville, Maryland
 Poston Butte High School, founded in 2009 in San Tan Valley, Arizona